
Taishan may refer to:

Mount Tai or Taishan, Shandong, China
Taishan District, Tai'an, named after the Mount Tai, a district in Tai'an, Shandong, China
Taishan, Guangdong, a county-level city of Jiangmen, Guangdong, China
Greater Taishan Region, a region in Guangdong consisting of the cities of Taishan, Kaiping, Xinhui, Jiangmen, Enping and Heshan
Taishan railway station (Guangdong)
Taishan Nuclear Power Plant in Taishan, Guangdong province, China
Taishan District, New Taipei, a district in New Taipei, Taiwan

Subdistricts in China
Taishan Subdistrict, Nanjing, in Pukou District, Nanjing, Jiangsu
Taishan Subdistrict, Xuzhou, in Quanshan District, Xuzhou, Jiangsu
Taishan Subdistrict, Jilin City, in Fengman District, Jilin City, Jilin Province

Towns in China
Taishan, Henan, in Huojia County, Henan
Taishan, Baicheng, in Da'an, Jilin

Townships in China
Taishan Township, Gansu, in Liangdang County, Gansu
Taishan Township, Jiangxi, in Anfu County, Jiangxi

See also
Sacrifice to Taishan
Daishan County, Zhejiang, China
Taishanese, a dialect of Yue Chinese and a sister dialect of Guangzhou Cantonese
Taishanese people, the people who reside in or have ancestry in the Greater Taishan Region
Shandong Luneng Taishan F.C., a Chinese football club based in Jinan, Shandong
Taishan Commandery, historical commandery of China
Tai Shan (disambiguation)
Taishang (disambiguation)